The Juan de Bolas River rises in Saint Catherine, Jamaica, and flows through Saint Catherine and Clarendon. It is one of two rivers in Jamaica named after Juan de Bolas, the first Chief of the Jamaican Maroons.

Course
The river rises just east of Juan de Bolas Mountain, at just under  from where it flows north, north-west, west and south-south-west to a confluence with the Rio Minho.

Tributaries
Tributaries (source to confluence) include: 
Seven unnamed streams
Tingley Gulley
Pindars River

References

Rivers of Jamaica